Anna Koumantou (born 3 December 1982 in Patras) is a retired Greek tennis player.

Koumantou won two doubles titles on the ITF Circuit in her career. On 11 June 2007, she reached her best singles ranking of world No. 573. On 25 February 2008, she peaked at No. 263 in the WTA doubles rankings.

Koumantou made her WTA Tour main-draw debut at the 2007 Istanbul Cup, in the doubles event partnering Sandra Klösel. Koumantou played her last match in 2008, and then retired from the sport.

ITF Circuit finals

Singles: 1 (0–1)

Doubles: 12 (2–10)

External links

 
 
 

1982 births
Living people
Greek female tennis players
Sportspeople from Patras